Igor Nikolayevich Kriushenko (born 10 February 1964) is a Belarusian professional football manager and former player.

Honours

Manager
BATE Borisov
Belarusian Premier League: 2006, 2007
Belarusian Cup: 2005–06

Torpedo-BelAZ Zhodino
Belarusian Cup: 2015–16

Other achievements
Final of Cup  (BATE 2005, 2007).
Third qualification round of Champions League (BATE, 2007).
Silver medalist Belarus league (Dinamo Minsk, 2008).
Promoted FC Sibir Novosibirsk from Russian First Division to Premier League (2009).
Final of Russian cup  (2010).
Play-off round of Europa League (2010).

As a player, he made his debut in the Soviet Second League in 1985 for Khimik Grodno.

Managerial statistics

References

1964 births
Living people
Footballers from Minsk
Soviet footballers
Belarusian footballers
Association football defenders
Belarusian expatriate footballers
Expatriate footballers in Russia
Belarusian Premier League players
FC Dinamo Minsk players
FC Neman Grodno players
FC Lida players
FC Alga Bishkek players
FC Aktobe players
FC Torpedo Mogilev players
Belarusian football managers
Belarusian expatriate football managers
Expatriate football managers in Russia
Expatriate football managers in Uzbekistan
Expatriate football managers in Indonesia
Belarusian expatriate sportspeople in Indonesia
Russian Premier League managers
FC BATE Borisov managers
FC Dinamo Minsk managers
FC Sibir Novosibirsk managers
FC Shurtan Guzar managers
FC Torpedo Zhodino managers
Belarus national football team managers
FC Dynamo Brest managers